Sir William Rupert Hay  (December 16, 1893 – April 3, 1962) was a British Indian Army officer and administrator in British India. He served as Chief Commissioner of Balochistan during the colonial era.

Career
Hay was educated at Bradfield and University College, Oxford. He was commissioned in the Dorsetshire Regiment in 1914 and served during World War I in Mesopotamia. He transferred to the Indian Army and was attached to the 24th Punjabis, being appointed Quarter-Master 30 October 1916.  He was promoted to Lieutenant in 1918. He was seconded to the Foreign and Political Department in May 1920 and was confirmed in his appointment in May 1924. He was Political Agent in South Waziristan 1924–28, Assistant Commissioner in Mardan 1928–31, and Political Agent in Malakand 1931–33. He was Resident in Waziristan 1940–41, Resident in the Persian Gulf 1941–42, Revenue and Judicial Commissioner in Balochistan 1942–43 and Agent to the Governor-General, Resident and Chief Commissioner in Balochistan 1943–46. He was again Political Resident in the Persian Gulf from 1946 to 1953 when he retired from the service and returned to England.

Publications
Two Years in Kurdistan : Experiences of a Political Officer, 1918-1920, Sidgwick & Jackson, London, 1921
The Persian Gulf States, Middle East Institute, Washington D.C., 1959.

References
HAY, Lt-Col Sir (William) Rupert, Who Was Who, A & C Black, 1920–2015 (online edition, Oxford University Press, 2014)
Obituary – Sir Rupert Hay – The Indian Political Service, The Times, London, 4 April 1962, page 15

1893 births
1962 deaths
People educated at Bradfield College
Alumni of University College, Oxford
British Indian Army officers
Chief Commissioners of Baluchistan
Knights Commander of the Order of St Michael and St George
Knights Commander of the Order of the Indian Empire
Companions of the Order of the Star of India
Indian Political Service officers
British people in colonial India